Tales for the Midnight Hour is a series of scary children's books written by Judith Bauer Stamper. This anthology horror series served as the precursor to various other similar works, including Scary Stories to Tell in the Dark and Scary Stories for Sleep-overs. Published by Scholastic's Point Horror banner, this popular series spawned 3 sequels and lasted from 1977-1991.

Overview
The series was written for a younger audience, but was told much darker than many books of the time. With the exception of the first volume, each book contained 13 stories, usually involving youths trying to find their way out of spooky/paranormal situations.

In 1992, the first book in the series was released on audiobook in cassette form.

The series has since been republished in 2005, with new cover art, in a 2-volume collection.

Books
{| class="wikitable" style="width:100%;"
|-
!  style="width:30px; background:#AE1C26; color:#fff;"|# !!  style="background:#AE1C26;color:#fff;"|Title !!  style="width:160px; background:#AE1C26; color:#fff;"|Author !! style="background:#AE1C26;color:#fff;"|Original published date !! style="background:#AE1C26;color:#fff;"|Pages !!  style="width:120px; background:#AE1C26;"|ISBN

|}

See also
 Scholastic Books
 Scary Stories to Tell in the Dark
 Scary Stories for Sleep-overs
 Short & Shivery

References 

Series of children's books
Horror short story collections
1977 short story collections
1977 children's books